Vladimir Fedorovich Chekalov (July 6, 1922 – June 4, 1992) was a Russian Soviet realist painter and art teacher, who lived and worked in Leningrad. He was a member of the Leningrad Union of Artists, and regarded as a representative of the Leningrad school of painting, most famous for his battle and genre paintings.

Biography
Vladimir Fedorovich Chekalov was born July 6, 1922, in the village of Novaya-Vyaltsevo, Sologalich county of Kostroma Province in the Soviet Russia.

In 1926 his family moved to Leningrad. In 1936, Vladimir Chekalov, who has shown the ability to draw, goes to the Secondary Art School at the All-Russian Academy of Arts. His teachers there were noted art educators Pavel Naumov, Alexander Zaitsev, Samuil Nevelshtein, Mikhail Natarevich.

Together with Vladimir Chekalov in those years in the Secondary Art School involved many well known in the future artists and sculptors: Evgenia Antipova, Mikhail Anikushin, Vecheslav Zagonek, Victor Teterin, Alexei Eriomin, Marina Kozlovskaya, Oleg Lomakin, Maya Kopitseva, Abram Grushko, and others. In 1941, Vladimir Chekalov graduated from the Secondary Art School.

In July 1941, Vladimir Chekalov was drafted into the Red Army and took part in the Great Patriotic War, which led the Soviet people against Nazi Germany and its allies. As sapper he participated in the Battle of Stalingrad, was wounded and marked by military awards.

In 1944-1945, Vladimir Chekalov of the 3rd Ukrainian Front took part in the liberation of the Nazi occupation of Romania, Bulgaria, Hungary, Yugoslavia, and Austria. Vladimir Chekalov demobilized in 1946. During the war, he lost all the family: his parents died in the siege of Leningrad, two elder brothers were killed at the front.

After demobilization in October 1946, Vladimir Chekalov entered at the first course of Department of Painting of the Leningrad Institute of Painting, Sculpture and Architecture named after Ilya Repin. There he studied under Alexander Zaytsev, Boris Fogel, Genrikh Pavlovsky, Lija Ostrova, Semion Abugov, Mikhail Platunov, and Joseph Serebriany.

In 1952, Vladimir Chekalov graduated from the Leningrad Institute of Painting, Sculpture and Architecture as artist of painting in Rudolf Frentz workshop, together with Sergei Babkov, Leonid Baykov, Irina Baldina, Dmitry Beliaev, Abram Grushko, Marina Kozlovskaya, Boris Korneev, Elena Kostenko, Oleg Lomakin, Piotr Fomin, Boris Lavrenko, and other young artists. His graduated work was genre painting named "Soldier kitchen", devoted the first days of a new life in the liberation from Nazi German town.

At the end of 1952, Vladimir Chekalov's graduation work exhibited in Moscow at the All-Union Exhibition of graduation works of students of art institutes. In February 1953 the magazine "Soviet Union", published in six languages, placed in a full page spread color reproductions of paintings and an article about the author that brought the young artist to fame.

Vladimir Chekalov participated in art exhibitions since 1952, mainly as a master of battle paintings and genre compositions. The main theme of the artist has an image of a Russian soldier-liberator. In 1950–1960 years he repeatedly referring to the theme of the soldier's heroism and creates paintings "Countrymen", "News from the Motherland", "On a halt. In Bulgaria ", "Fight the Black Sea Fleet sailors at the Eltigen ", and others.

While working on a painting, Vladimir Chekalov painted a large number of sketches from life, many of them are excellent examples of realistic painting.

In the late 1950s - 1960's, Vladimir Chekalov commits creative journey to the Crimea, works in the town of Old Ladoga, at the Academic dacha, a lot of time with a landscape. In this genre with particular force revealed spectacular talent of the artist, his sense of color and the ability to transfer the state of the lighting and air environment.

Since 1953, Vladimir Chekalov was a member of the Leningrad Union of Artists. In 1970–1980 years he taught at art school for deaf children in Pavlovsk, near Leningrad.

Vladimir Fedorovich Chekalov died in Saint Petersburg in 1992. His paintings reside in art museums and private collections in Russia, France, England, Germany, Italy, the U.S., and others.

Honours and awards
 Order of the Red Star
 Order of the Patriotic War, 2nd Class, twice
 Medal "For the Victory over Germany in the Great Patriotic War 1941–1945"
 Medal "For the Defence of Stalingrad"
 Medal "For the Capture of Vienna"
 Medal "For the Capture of Budapest"
 Medal "For the Liberation of Belgrade"

See also

 Fine Art of Leningrad
 Leningrad School of Painting
 List of painters of Saint Petersburg Union of Artists
 Saint Petersburg Union of Artists

References

Bibliography
 1917 — 1957. Выставка произведений ленинградских художников. Каталог. — Л: Ленинградский художник, 1958. — с.34.
 Выставка произведений ленинградских художников 1960 года. Каталог. — Л: Художник РСФСР, 1961. — с.45.
 Двести лет Академии художеств СССР. Каталог выставки. — Л.-М.: Искусство, 1958. — с.176.
 Ленинград. Зональная выставка. — Л: Художник РСФСР, 1965. — с.61.
 Справочник членов Союза художников СССР. Том 2. — М: Советский художник, 1979. — с. 541. — 644 с.
 Выставки советского изобразительного искусства. Справочник. Том 5. 1954—1958 годы. — М: Советский художник, 1981. — с. 48, 195, 387. — 964 с.
 Справочник членов Ленинградской организации Союза художников РСФСР. -Л: Художник РСФСР, 1987. — с. 143. — 160 с.
 Ленинградские художники. Живопись 1950—1980 годов. Каталог. — Санкт-Петербург: Выставочный центр Санкт-Петербургского Союза художников, 1994. — с.4.
 Этюд в творчестве ленинградских художников. Выставка произведений. Каталог. — Санкт — Петербург: Мемориальный музей Н. А. Некрасова, 1994. — с.6.
 Лирика в произведениях художников военного поколения. Выставка произведений. Каталог. — Санкт-Петербург: Мемориальный музей Н. А. Некрасова, 1995. — с.6.
 Живопись 1940—1990 годов. Ленинградская школа. Выставка произведений. — Санкт-Петербург: Мемориальный музей Н. А. Некрасова, 1996. — с.4.
 Soviet Union Journal. - 1953: issue 2 (36).
 Sergei V. Ivanov. Unknown Socialist Realism. The Leningrad School. - Saint Petersburg: NP-Print Edition, 2007. – pp. 9, 15, 18, 20, 24, 27, 29, 31, 42, 90, 364, 389-401, 403-406, 414-424, 439. , .

1922 births
1992 deaths
People from Soligalichsky District
Soviet painters
Socialist realist artists
Soviet military personnel of World War II
Leningrad Secondary Art School alumni
Leningrad School artists
Repin Institute of Arts alumni
Members of the Leningrad Union of Artists